Maxwell & Demon Gargoyle is an outdoor 1989 sculpture by Wayne Chabre, installed in Eugene, Oregon, in the United States. It is a low-relief portrait depicting Scottish physicist James Clerk Maxwell and his "demon", attached to the exterior of Willamette Hall on the University of Oregon campus. The hammered copper sheet sculpture measures approximately  x  x . Its condition was undetermined when the Smithsonian Institution's "Save Outdoor Sculpture!" program surveyed the work in 1994.

See also

 1989 in art

References

1989 establishments in Oregon
1989 sculptures
Busts in Oregon
Copper sculptures in Oregon
Demons in popular culture
Fictional demons and devils
James Clerk Maxwell
Monuments and memorials in Eugene, Oregon
Outdoor sculptures in Eugene, Oregon
Sculptures by Wayne Chabre
Sculptures of men in Oregon
University of Oregon campus